Hailar District, formerly a county-level city, is an urban district that serves as the seat of the prefecture-level city Hulunbuir in northeastern Inner Mongolia, China. Hulunbuir, due to its massive size, is a city in administrative terms only, being mainly grassland and rural.

Long known as the "Pearl of the Grasslands", Hailar acts as a gateway between China and Russia. The district spans an area of 1,319.8 square kilometers, and has an estimated population of 365,000 as of 2010. The district serves as a regional center for commerce, trade, and transportation.

History 

Hailar was founded as a Chinese fort in 1734, and during the administration of the Republic of China, it was the capital city of Xing'an Province. It was a center of agricultural production on the historical Chinese Eastern Railway. Once known as Hulun, Hailar today is a relatively small, but thriving modern industrial city of around 300,000, its population having soared from an estimated 20,000 in the mid-20th century.

After the Mukden Incident in 1931, Japan invaded China's northeastern provinces and established the puppet state of Manchukuo. Hailar Fortress, a huge underground Japanese fortress, was completed in 1937 by forced Chinese laborers. The Kwantung Army garrisoned in Manchukuo built the fortress complex as one of biggest Japanese fortifications in Manchukuo. Some of the fiercest fighting of the Soviet–Japanese War in August 1945 took place around Hailar. Prisoners of war and civilians were massacred by the Kwantung Army in August 1945 during the final month of World War II. The World Anti-fascist War Hailar Memorial Park, a museum and war memorial, is built on the site of the Hailar Fortress, parts of the fortress tunnels are open for public viewing.

Transportation 

Hulunbuir Hailar Airport serves the city, with flights to Beijing and Shenyang amongst others.  Hailar's railway station is the penultimate major station before Manzhouli, the port city that stands close to the Russian border.  It is on the famous Western line of the Trans-Siberian express route and China National Highway 301. Trains to Harbin take about 12 hours, and 27 to Beijing.  Hailar has a frequent series of buses that cover the town.

Geography 
Of the city's 1,319.8 square kilometers, 28 square kilometers (or 2.12%) of the district is urban.

Administrative divisions
Hailar is divided into 6 subdistricts and 2 towns: Zhengyang Subdistrict, Kaoshan Subdistrict, Jiankang Subdistrict, Shengli Subdistrict, Hulun Subdistrict, Jianshe Subdistrict, Fendou, and Hake.

Climate
Hailar has a humid continental climate (Köppen Dwb) bordering on a subarctic climate (Köppen Dwc). Winters are long, very dry and severe, due to the semi−permanent Siberian High, while summers are short, though very warm, and rather wet, due to the East Asian monsoon. With monthly percent possible sunshine ranging from 55% in December to 69% in February, sunshine is abundant year-round, and the annual total is 2,719 hours. More than two-thirds of the annual rainfall occurs during the three summer months. The Mohe-Huma-Hailar triangle between northern Heilongjiang and Northeastern Inner Mongolia, which almost equivalent to China's subarctic climate zone, suffers the most severe cold winter in China.

Culture 

Hailar is a multi-ethnic town, with notable Han, Mongolian, Hui, Daur, Evenki, Russian populations. As such, signs are usually bilingual and Mongolian influence pervades in songs played on shop CD players, domes on buildings and the everyday speech of some locals.

Composer Vladimir Ussachevsky was born in Hailar, as well as leading news anchor Bai Yansong; the folk metal band Nine Treasures also originated in Hailar.

Sister city 
 Chita, Zabaykalsky Krai, Russia.
 Chinggis City, Mongolia.

References

External links 

 Hailar at Encyclopædia Britannica
Official website of Hailar District Government 
Post codes of Inner Mongolia (English)

Populated places established in 1734
County-level divisions of Inner Mongolia
Hulunbuir